Robert Thomas "Bob" Davis (born 3, 1927 – June 12, 2010) was an offensive tackle in the National Football League playing for the Boston Yanks. He played collegiately for the Georgia Tech football team where he was a member of the Chi Phi Fraternity.

In 1956, he was Mayor of Columbus, Georgia.

References

External links
 NFL.com player page
 Obituary

1927 births
2010 deaths
All-American college football players
American athlete-politicians
American football offensive tackles
Boston Yanks players
Georgia Tech Yellow Jackets football players
Players of American football from Columbus, Georgia
Mayors of Columbus, Georgia